The Millennium Product status was awarded by the Design Council to British products and companies which show "imagination, ingenuity and inspiration" as well as "innovation, creativity and design".

Over 4,000 products were submitted, and 1,012 were selected for the award. The products were exhibited adjacent to the Millennium Dome during 2000.

References

Design awards
Awards established in 2000
Awards disestablished in 2000
2000 establishments in the United Kingdom
2000 disestablishments in the United Kingdom
2000 in the United Kingdom